Inkamana High School is in Vryheid, Kwazulu Natal, South Africa. It was started in 1923 and had 200 boarding students in 2009.

History
Inkamana is recognised as a historic school. It is situated in the heart of the Zululand. Inkamana High School was started 2 February 1923 as an intermediate School with only one class of grade 5 by Benedictine Missionaries from the Benedictine Congregation of St. Ottilien in Germany. The school had fifteen pupils, four boys and eleven girls, all from Vryheid and the Paulpietersburg district. They were all boarders at Inkamana. They paid sixpence a month for school fees and brought farm and garden products to pay for their boarding accommodation.

A Roman Catholic Missionary School, was founded in 1918 .

The first Junior Certificate Examination was held at Inkamana in November 1934. The Senior Certificate course at Inkamana began in 1935 and a year later four pupils were preparing for their graduation. However, three of them left. The only remaining student, Ulrica Dzivane, successfully wrote her Senior Certificate Examination in Nov. 1936. Since then the Senior Certificate results have gained for Inkamana the reputation of being one of the best schools in the country. The failure rate was always low.

Today
The school recorded a hundred percent pass rate in matric examinations from 1969 until now, 2009. 
Presently the student enrolment is 200 with one class for each grade.

This co-educational boarding school is part of, and located within, Inkamana Abbey in the Abaqulusi region of KwaZulu Natal Province. There is a monastery, church, farm and other related activities as part of the location.

In 2007 Inkamana was amongst several schools recognised as "historic schools". Funding of six million rand a year was earmarked for Adams College, Inkamana High School, Ohlange High School, Inanda Seminary and Vryheid Comprehensive High School to make them academies focussing on Maths, Science and Technology. Anglican Archbishop Emeritus Njongonkulu Ndungane has said that they still need funds and  "little has been achieved since democracy".

Alumni
Oswald Mbuyiseni Mtshali, poet
Norman Qashana Emmanuel Khuzwayo (Political Activist. Qashana Khuzwayo Road in Pinetown is named after him.)
Gabriel Ndabandaba, Member of Parliament 
Zanele Mbeki, former RSA first lady
Prince Gideon Zulu, politician from Zulu Royal family
Cassius Lubisi, Director-General and Secretary to Cabinet: RSA
Dr Malibongwe Mthethwa first black person to own a private hospital in kzn(nongoma private hospital)
 Thando Zikalala....
Leornard LJ Mncwango (Author of "Ngenzeni")
Dr Fabian Ribeiro – (Medical doctor and Political Activist – He was murdered by Apartheid Agents)
Mrs Florence Barbara Ribeiro (uKaMathe was a Political Activist – She was murdered with her husband (whom she met at Inkamana) by Apartheid Agents.
Adv Marumo Moerane
Dr Phumzile Helen Ngobese (First black woman medical doctor in KwaZulu-Natal)
Ms Hilda Mtshali (First Black Female Optometrist in South Africa)
Dr Mavuso Msimang – Secretary to Oliver Reginald Tambo
Dr Constance Simelane (Former Deputy Prime Minister – eSwatini)
Dr Ambrose Phesheya Zwane (First Swazi to graduate as a doctor. A leading figure in Swazi politics and opposition to British Colonial rule)
Mr Peter-Paul Ngwenya of Makana Investment (ex Robben Island Prisoner)
Mr Vusi Mazibuko (Chairperson: Mnambithi Group)
Mr Sithembiso Mthethwa (Mion Holdings)
Mr Abel Moffat Sithole (CEO: Public Investment Cooperation – PIC)
Mrs Philisiwe Mthethwa (CEO: National Empowerment Fund)
Dr Sifiso Goodhope Maseko (CEO: Chris Hani-Baragwanath Hospital)
Dr Thandeka Mbokazi (CEO: Inkosi Albert Luthuli Hospital)
Dr Nozipho Thuthukile Mashaba-Mogoru (Aviation Medicine)
Mr Albert Mthunzi Luthuli (MD: Luthuli Corporation)
Mr Ndumiso Ngcobo (Author and Radio Personality)
Mr Vusi Letsoalo (Radio Personality)
Mr Buyile Mdladla (Radio and TV Personality)
Dr Ntethelelo Mjoli (Neurosurgeon)
Dr Mbokeleng "Boki" Sikhosana (Vascular Surgeon)
Dr Bongiwe Pepu (Urologist)
Dr Mpucuko Nxumalo (Electrical Engineer and Anesthesiologist)
Dr Sibongile Zungu (HOD: Health – KwaZulu-Natal
Dr Thobile Sifunda (HOD: Sport and Recreation -KwaZulu-Natal
Adv Sdu Gumede (Advisor to Minister Gugile Nkwinti)
Mr Mxolisi "Mbazo"Nkosi (Municipal Manager: Msunduzi Municipality)
Mr Maurice Radebe (Former MD: SASOL and now Head and Director of the Wits Business School (WBS))
Mr Mabutho Zwane (CEO: Eastern Cape Gambling Board and President of the International Association of Gaming Regulators (IAGR))
Mr Darius Mfana Temba Dhlomo (9 August 1931 – 13 June 2015 in Enschede) was a South African footballer, boxer, musician[1] and a political activist
Mr Charles Dube Molapo (Minister of Foreign Affairs: Lesotho)
Sr Cathrine Martina Msimang (Zulu Composer)
Ms Philisiwe Sibiya (CFO: MTN)
Dr Thanti Mthanti (Academic)
Mr Zuzifa Buthelezi (Director: Mazibuye Investments. Inkosi Mangosuthu Buthelezi)
Alfred Msezane (Professor of physics, Clark Atlanta University)
 Mr Bhekuyise Gideon Dlamini (Former Company Secretary of Small Enterprise Finance Agency)

References

External links 
 

Schools in KwaZulu-Natal
Boarding schools in South Africa
High schools in South Africa
Educational institutions established in 1923
1923 establishments in South Africa